Lamentation Mountain State Park is an undeveloped public recreation area covering  in the town of Berlin, Connecticut. It entered the roll of state parks in the 1936 edition of the Connecticut Register and Manual. The park offers hiking and scenic vistas.

References

External links
Lamentation Mountain State Park Connecticut Department of Energy and Environmental Protection
U.S. Geological Survey Map at the U.S. Geological Survey Map Website. Retrieved January 6th, 2023.

State parks of Connecticut
Berlin, Connecticut
Parks in Hartford County, Connecticut
Protected areas established in 1936
1936 establishments in Connecticut